Aplastodiscus perviridis is a species of frog in the family Hylidae.
It is found in Argentina, Brazil, and possibly Paraguay.
Its natural habitats are subtropical or tropical moist lowland forests, subtropical or tropical moist montane forests, subtropical or tropical moist shrublands, subtropical or tropical dry lowland grasslands, rivers, and freshwater marshes.

References

Aplastodiscus
Amphibians described in 1950
Taxonomy articles created by Polbot